The Congress of Ukrainian Nationalists ( Konhres ukrayinskykh natsionalistiv) is a far-right political party in Ukraine. It was founded on October 18, 1992, and registered with the Ministry of Justice on January 26, 1993. The party leader from its formation until her death in 2003 was Yaroslava Stetsko (people's deputy of three Verkhovna Rada conventions).

History

The party was set up late 1992 by émigrés of OUN-B on the initiative of Slava Stetsko and Roman Zvarych. It was registered on 26 January 1993 by the Ukrainian Ministry of Justice and was the 11th political party in Ukraine that was officially registered.

During the 1998 parliamentary election, the party was part (together with Ukrainian Conservative Republican Party and Ukrainian Republican Party) of the Election Bloc "National Front" which won 2,71% of the national votes and 6 (single-mandate constituency) seats.

At the parliamentary elections on 30 March 2002, the party was part of the Viktor Yushchenko Bloc Our Ukraine. Former party leader Oleksiy Ivchenko was the head of Naftogas of Ukraine under the Yekhanurov Government. He was elected as the party leader at the seventh convention of the party on April 13, 2003.

During the parliamentary elections of 2006 on 26 March, the party was part of the Our Ukraine alliance. Roman Zvarych was Minister of Justice of Ukraine in the First Tymoshenko Government and Second Tymoshenko Government and in the Alliance of National Unity.

At the end of 2006, the Prosecutor General of Ukraine’s Office opened a criminal case against party leader Oleksii Ivchenko on charges of embezzlement and abuse of his official position as former head of Naftogaz. Ivchenko was dropped from its party ticket in the spring of 2007. The party refused to join the Our Ukraine–People's Self-Defense Bloc in August 2007 and almost a month before the elections decided not to run in the 2007 parliamentary elections.

In the 2010 local elections, the party biggest achievement was winning two seats in the Lviv Oblast Counsel. In December 2011, Stepan Bratsiun was elected party leader.

The party competed on one single party under "umbrella" party Our Ukraine in the 2012 parliamentary election, together with Ukrainian People's Party; this list won 1.11% of the national votes and no constituencies and thus failed to win parliamentary representation. The party itself had competed in 28 constituencies and lost in all.

In the 2014 parliamentary election, the party was electable on a nationwide list and it participated in 8 constituencies; but its candidates lost in all of them and the party received only 0.05% of the votes nationwide and thus the party won no parliamentary seats.

On 19 November 2018, the Congress of Ukrainian Nationalists and fellow Ukrainian nationalist political organizations Organization of Ukrainian Nationalists, Right Sector and C14 endorsed the Ruslan Koshulynskyi candidacy in the 2019 presidential election. In the election Koshulynskyi received 1.6% of the votes.

In the 2020 local elections, the party gained 17 deputies (0.03% of all available mandates).

Ideology
The party supports the corporate statism, ultranationalism and a strong nation state independent from Russia. The party appears to express support for Zionism and Israel (although not the Israeli government for prosecuting John Demjanjuk, who they believe is wrongly accused of Nazi war crimes), and regards Ze'ev Jabotinsky as a hero, as it features articles by Moysey Fishbein as well as a few other articles.

Goals
 Strengthening of Ukrainian national values among the masses of Ukrainian society.
 Strengthening political, social and cultural rights of the Ukrainian nation.
 Bringing to power highly-educated professional patriots.
 Overcoming the consequences of the colonial past, cosmopolitanism (derogatory epithet for Jews coined by Joseph Stalin during his antisemitic campaign of 1949–1953), mass-Russification, complex of less-worth culture, and others.
 Insuring politically free comprehensive development and full self-expression of creative and spiritual forces of the Ukrainian nation, and its establishment in the circle of freedom-loving nations of the world as the fully valued subject of history.
 Removal of "visual vestiges" of the Soviet Union from Ukraine, including monuments to Lenin.

Leaders
Slava Stetsko (1992–2003)
Oleksiy Ivchenko (2003–2010)
Stepan Bratsiun (2010–present)

Symbols

The flag of the Congress of Ukrainian Nationalists is a rectangular two-color banner with two horizontal halves. The upper half is red and the bottom half is black. It is inspired by the flag of the Ukrainian Insurgent Army. There emblem is based on that of the former Organization of Ukrainian Nationalists. The red background circle is in-framed by the black (outside) and gold (inside) line with a cross which is placed in the middle and appears to be as a sword. The sword, being aimed blade down, has a dual meaning: the organization in its activities is guided by the principles of Christian morality and the Congress of Ukrainian Nationalists is ready to protect the Ukrainian State.

Motto
Glory to Ukraine! To Heroes (her) Glory! Other versions include, but not limited to Glory to free Ukraine! To Heroes (her) Glory!

Electoral results

References

External links
Official website 
Political parties of Ukraine at narod.ru

1993 establishments in Ukraine
Euromaidan
Far-right political parties in Ukraine
Political parties established in 1993
Right-wing populism in Ukraine
Zionism in Ukraine